Mary Walsh is a former camogie player, captain of the All Ireland Camogie Championship winning team in 1968.All Ireland senior medals in 1969.

Career
She was the outstanding Wexford player of the era, playing Gael Linn Cup inter-provincial camogie and starred for Wexford in their unsuccessful 1966 Leinster final bid. She was named Power’s Gold Label Wexford camogie player of the year in 1971, having previously won a Wexford sportsperson of the year award for tennis in 1968 and 1970.

Personal life
She played in the 1972 Leinster final the day after she married Larry Cahill from Rathnure.

References

External links
 Camogie.ie Official Camogie Association Website
 Wikipedia List of Camogie players

Wexford camogie players
Living people
Year of birth missing (living people)